The following is a list of episodes for the Warner Bros. Animation and Amblin Entertainment animated television series Pinky and the Brain, which ran from 1995 to 1998. The series was a spin-off from another Warner Bros. Animation's animated series, Animaniacs, and includes some of the Pinky and the Brain skits that were created as part of that show.

Pinky and the Brain was later retooled as the short-lived Pinky, Elmyra & the Brain, which ran in the 1998–1999 season for 13 episodes. The characters eventually returned to their roots as an Animaniacs skit in the 2020 revival of that series.

Outside of both the original Animaniacs and its revival, there were 65 Pinky and the Brain episodes produced.

The lists below are ordered by season, and then by episode number. Several episodes included two or more skits; these are identified by the segment number. The episode list reflects the show as aired in repeats and syndication and presented on the series DVDs; some initial Season 1 episodes had two or more programming variations on their first run.

Series overview

Episodes

Season 1 (1995–96)

Season 2 (1996–97)

Season 3 (1997–98)

Season 4 (1998)

</onlyinclude>

References

External links

Pinky and the Brain episodes
Animaniacs